This list of Gemeindebauten in Vienna provides an overview of the residential buildings, courtyards, and housing estates built by the city of Vienna, Austria, in the context of municipal housing construction. The residential buildings built in the 1920s during the First Austrian Republic are internationally known for their distinct architectural features.

During the First Republic, 382 municipal buildings, designed by 199 architects, were built in Vienna. In total, nearly 65,000 apartments were completed between 1919 and 1934 in every single district in Vienna except for the first district. The burst of construction activity under Red Vienna ended with the seizure of power by the Austrofascists in 1934.

Construction activity resumed in 1947 during the post-war period—Per-Albin-Hansson-Siedlung was the first large new building. Due to the significant lack of housing in post-war Vienna, the city built 96,000 new apartments from 1947 to 1970. Today, the city of Vienna owns around 220,000 apartments in more than 2,300 community buildings with more than 500,000 residents.

Innere Stadt

Leopoldstadt

Landstraße

Wieden

Margareten

Mariahilf

Neubau

Josefstadt

Alsergrund

Favoriten

Simmering

Meidling

Hietzing

Penzing

Rudolfsheim-Fünfhaus

Ottakring

Hernals

Währing

Döbling

Brigittenau

Floridsdorf

Donaustadt

Liesing

References
 Hans und Rudolf Hautmann: Die Gemeindebauten des Roten Wien 1919–1934. Wien 1980.
 Helmut Weihsmann: Das Rote Wien. Sozialdemokratische Architektur und Kommunalpolitik 1919–1934. Wien 1985/2002.
 Peter Autengruber, Ursula Schwarz: Lexikon der Wiener Gemeindebauten – Namen • Denkmäler • Sehenswürdigkeiten. Pichler-Verlag. Wien 2013.

External links

 Wiener Kulturgut | Kartenlayer „Gemeindebauten“
 Kommunale Wohnbauten der Ersten Republik in the Weblexicon of Viennese Social Democracy
 Hofbeschreibungen aller Wiener Gemeindebauten von Wiener Wohnen | Städtische Wohnhausanlagen mit Baujahr und Wohnungsanzahl

Vienna-related lists
Residential buildings in Vienna
Public housing in Austria